Pilisborosjenő is a village in Pest county, Budapest metropolitan area, Hungary. It has a population of 3,373 (2012).

References

External links

Populated places in Pest County
Hungarian German communities